Moculta is a locality in the Australian state of South Australia located about  north-east of the state capital of Adelaide and about  north-east of the municipal seat of Angaston. At the 2016 census, Moculta shared a population of 227 with part of Truro).

The earliest settlers in the area were English, Scottish and Irish migrants, among them the brothers Abraham and David Shannon. German migrants also came to the area from 1853. They built both the Gruenberg (1859) and Gnadenberg Lutheran churches. The township of Moculta itself was surveyed in 1865 and occupied soon after.

The locality of Grünberg was renamed to Karalta as a consequence of the move to rename "names of enemy origin" during World War I, but has been named back to the anglicised Gruenberg since then. It is now included in Moculta and Penrice Gnadenberg is also now included in Moculta.

Gallery

References

Notes

Citations

Towns in South Australia
Barossa Valley